Matthew Lipman (August 24, 1923 in Vineland, New Jersey – December 26, 2010 in West Orange, New Jersey) is recognized as the founder of Philosophy for Children.  His decision to bring philosophy to young people came from his experience as a professor at Columbia University, where he witnessed underdeveloped reasoning skills in his students. His interest lay particularly in developing reasoning skills by teaching logic. The belief that children possess the ability to think abstractly from an early age led him to the conviction that bringing logic to children's education earlier would help them to improve their reasoning skills.

In 1972 he left Columbia for Montclair State College to establish the Institute for the Advancement of Philosophy for Children (IAPC) where he began to take philosophy into K-12 classrooms in Montclair. That year he also published his first book specifically designed to help children practice philosophy, Harry Stottlemeier's Discovery. The IAPC continues to develop and publish curriculum, working internationally to advance and improve philosophy for children.

Lipman died, aged 87, in West Orange, New Jersey on December 26, 2010. Lipman's marriage to his first wife, New Jersey State Senator Wynona Lipman, ended with their divorce.

Academic timeline

Undergraduate study at Stanford University, California; Shrivenham American University, England; School of General Studies, Columbia University, New York.
1948 – B.S., Columbia University, General Studies.
1953 – Instructor in Philosophy, Brooklyn College, Spring.
Graduate study at Columbia University; Sorbonne, Paris; University of Vienna, Austria.
1953 – Ph.D., Columbia University.
1953 to 1975 – Adjunct Assistant and Associate Professor, School of General Studies, Columbia University.
1954 to 1972 – Assistant, Associate and Professor of Philosophy, College of Pharmaceutical Sciences, Columbia University, (Also, Chairman, Department of General Education during this period).
1954 to 1962 – Lecturer in Philosophy and Contemporary Civilization, Columbia College, Columbia University.
1955 to 1963 – Lecturer in Contemporary Civilization, Mannes College of Music, New York City.
1960 to 1972 – Chairman, Philosophy Department, Evening Division, Baruch School, City College of New York.
1961 to 1963 – Lecturer in Contemporary Civilization, College of Engineering, Columbia University.
1962 to 1972 – Chairman, Department of General Education, College of Pharmaceutical Sciences, Columbia University.
1963 to 1964 – Visiting Professor of Philosophy, Sarah Lawrence College.
1972 to 2001 – Professor of Philosophy, Montclair State College / University.
1974 to 2001 – Director, Institute for the Advancement of Philosophy for Children, Montclair State College / University.

Bibliography
What Happens in Art (New York:  Appleton Century Crofts, 1967).
Discovering Philosophy (1st edition, New York:  Appleton Century Crofts, 1969; 2nd edition, Englewood Cliffs, Prentice Hall, 1977).
Contemporary Aesthetics (Boston:  Allyn and Bacon, 1973).
Harry Stottlemeier's Discovery (N.J.:  IAPC, 1974).
Philosophical Inquiry (Instructional Manual to Accompany Harry Stottlemeier's Discovery), with Ann Margaret Sharp (N.J.:  IAPC, 1975). Second Edition:  Philosophical Inquiry, with Ann Margaret Sharp and Frederick S. Oscanyan (N.J.:  IAPC, 1979), co published with University Press, 1984.
Philosophy for Children (edited with Terrell Ward Bynam) (Oxford:  Basil Blackwell, 1976).
Lisa (N.J.:  IAPC, 1976), 2nd edition, IAPC, 1983.
Ethical Inquiry, with Ann Margaret Sharp and Frederick S. Oscanyan (N.J.:  IAPC, 1977) 2nd ed., IAPC and UPA, 1985.
Philosophy in the Classroom, with Ann Margaret Sharp and Frederick S. Oscanyan (1st edition, N.J.:  IAPC, 1977.  2nd edition, Philadelphia:  Temple University Press, 1980).
Growing Up With Philosophy, ed. with Ann Margaret Sharp (Philadelphia:  Temple University Press, 1978).
Suki (N.J.:  IAPC, 1978).
Mark (N.J.:  IAPC, 1980).
Writing:  How and Why (instructional manual to accompany Suki; N.J.: IAPC, 1980).
Social Inquiry (instructional manual to accompany Mark; N.J.:  IAPC, 1980).
Pixie (N.J.:  IAPC, 1981).
Kio and Gus (N.J.:  IAPC, 1982).
Looking for Meaning (with Ann Margaret Sharp) (N.J.:  IAPC, 1982) UPA, 1984.
Wondering at the World (with Ann Margaret Sharp) (N.J.:  IAPC, 1984).
Elfie (N.J.:  IAPC, 1987).
Harry Prime (N.J.:  IAPC, 1987).
Philosophy Goes to School (Philadelphia:  Temple U. Press, 1988).
Getting Our Thoughts Together, with Ann Gazzard (Upper Montclair, NJ:  IAPC, 1988).
Thinking in Education (New York:  Cambridge University Press, 1991; 2nd edition, 2003).
Thinking Children and Education (Dubuque, Iowa:  Kendall/Hunt, 1993).
Natasha:  Vygotskian Dialogues (New York:  Teachers College Press, 1996).
Nous (New Jersey, I.A.P.C., 1996)
Deciding What to Do (Instructional Manual to Nous, New Jersey;IAPC, 1996)

See also
American philosophy
List of American philosophers

References

External links
IAPC home page
IAPC Timeline
 Summary and analysis of Lipman's Thinking in Education
The International Council of Philosophical Inquiry with Children
Philosophy for Children entry in Stanford Encyclopedia of Philosophy
Center of Research in Philosophy for Children -Argentina, C.I.Fi.N- Argentina
International Philosophy Olympiad

American philosophers
Philosophy education
Columbia University School of General Studies alumni
City College of New York faculty
Brooklyn College faculty
Stanford University alumni
Writers from New Jersey
People from Vineland, New Jersey
1923 births
2010 deaths
Mannes College The New School for Music faculty